Symplocos adenophylla grows as a shrub or tree up to  tall, with a trunk diameter of up to . Bark is grey to dark brown or black. Its fragrant flowers feature a white to yellow corolla. Fruit is blue when ripe. Habitat is forests from sea-level to  altitude. S. adenophylla is found in China, Thailand, Laos, Vietnam, Malaysia, Brunei and Indonesia.

References

adenophylla
Plants described in 1837
Flora of China
Flora of Indo-China
Flora of Malesia